The modern World Series, the current championship series of Major League Baseball (MLB) between teams of the National League and the American League, began in 1903, and was established as an annual event in 1905. This article discusses major-league champions before 1905, including championship series contested in that era, primarily between teams of the National League and the American Association.

History
Before the formation of the American Association (AA), which debuted in 1882, there were no playoff rounds—all championships went to the team with the best record at the end of the season.

In the initial season of the National League (NL) in 1876, there was controversy as to which team was the champion: the Chicago White Stockings, who had the best overall record (52–14), or the St. Louis Brown Stockings (45–19), who were the only team to have a winning record against every other franchise in the league. The teams agreed to play a five-game "Championship of the West" series, won by St. Louis, four games to one.

National League and American Association, 1882–1891

Beginning with an exhibition series after the American Association's birth in 1882, a championship series between the NL and AA regular-season champions was promoted and referred to as the "World's Championship Series" (WCS), or "World's Series" for short; however, these series are not officially recognized by Major League Baseball as part of World Series history. Though early publications, such as Ernest Lanigan's Baseball Cyclopedia and Hy Turkin and S. C. Thompson's Encyclopedia of Baseball, listed the 19th-century games on an equal basis with those of the 20th century, Sporting News publications about the World Series, which began in the 1920s, ignored the 19th-century games, as did most publications about the Series after 1960. MLB, in general, regards 19th-century events as a prologue to the modern era of baseball, with the birth of the present American League in 1901.

In the second year of the WCS, a dispute in the 1885 series concerned Game 2, which was forfeited by the St. Louis Browns (AA) to the Chicago White Stockings (NL) when the Browns pulled their team off the field protesting an umpiring decision. The managers, Cap Anson (St. Louis) and Charles Comiskey (Chicago), initially agreed to disregard the game. When St. Louis won the final game and an apparent series championship, three games to two, Chicago owner Albert Spalding overruled his manager and declared that he wanted the forfeit counted. The result of a tied WCS was that neither team got the prize money that had been posted by the owners before the series (and was returned to them after they both agreed it was a tie).

Series within the National League, 1892–1900
Following the collapse of the AA in 1891, four of its clubs (Cincinnati, Pittsburgh, St. Louis, and Brooklyn) were admitted to the NL. The league championship was awarded in 1892 by a playoff between half-season champions. This scheme was abandoned after one season. Beginning in 1893—and continuing until divisional play was introduced in 1969—the pennant was awarded to the first-place club in the standings at the end of the season. For four seasons, the pennant winner played the runners-up in the postseason championship series called the Temple Cup. A second attempt at this format was the Chronicle-Telegraph Cup series in 1900.

Champions before 1876
Notes: 
 A team's name links to an article about that team's season (rather than to the team in general) for 1871 and later.
 The only championship teams to last beyond 1876 (when the National League was founded) were the Chicago White Stockings (now the Chicago Cubs, NL) and the Boston Red Stockings (now the Atlanta Braves, NL).
 The Philadelphia Athletics (1860–1876) were not the same franchise as either the Philadelphia Athletics (American Association) of 1882–1890, or the former Philadelphia Athletics (American League) that later relocated to Kansas City, Missouri, and Oakland, California. Nor were the Brooklyn Atlantics of 1855 to circa 1882 the same franchise as the Brooklyn Atlantics founded in 1883–1884 and later known successively as the Brooklyn Grays, Brooklyn Bridegrooms, Brooklyn Grooms, Brooklyn Trolley Dodgers, Brooklyn Superbas, Brooklyn Robins, Brooklyn Dodgers, and (since 1958) the Los Angeles Dodgers.

Champions from 1876 to 1904

Notes: 
 Italicized names refer to years when two teams and their managers could claim equal status as champion, either because they did not play a series against each other, or because they tied such a series.
 A third bracketed and asterisked number in a series score refers to a tied game, such as 3–3–(1)
 A dagger indicates an exhibition series, such as in 1876, 1882 and 1883

Totals

Championship of the National Association of Base Ball Players

Championship of the National Association of Professional Base Ball Players

Championship of the National League (through 1904)

Championship of the American Association

Championship of the American League (through 1904)

Winner of the World's Championship Series

See also
List of World Series champions

References

World Series lists